At least two ships of the French Navy have been named Impétueux:

  a  launched in 1787 and captured by the Royal Navy in 1794
  a  launched in 1803 as Brutus but renamed before commission, she was lost in 1806

French Navy ship names